Tawang is a town and administrative headquarter of Tawang district in the Indian state of Arunachal Pradesh. The town was once the capital of the Tawang Tract, which is now divided into the Tawang district and the West Kameng district. Tawang continues as the headquarters of the former.

It is the site of a famous Gelugpa Buddhist Monastery.

History

Tawang is inhabited by the Monpa people. The Tawang Monastery was founded by the Merak Lama Lodre Gyatso in 1681 in accordance with the wishes of the 5th Dalai Lama, Ngawang Lobsang Gyatso, and has a legend surrounding its name. Ta means "horse" and wang means "chosen". So, the word Tawang means "chosen by horse". As per a legend, the Monastery is believed to have been chosen by a Horse Owned by Mera Lama Lodre Gyatso. The sixth Dalai Lama, Tsangyang Gyatso, was born in Tawang.

Tawang was historically under the control of Tibet. During the 1914 Simla Conference, Tibet and British India signed an agreement delineating their common boundary in the Assam Himalaya region, which came to be known as the McMahon Line. By this agreement, Tibet relinquished several hundred square miles of its territory, including Tawang, to the British. The agreement was not recognized by China. According to Tsering Shakya, the British records show that the Tibetans regarded the border agreed in 1914 as being conditional upon China accepting the Simla Convention. Since the British were unable to get China's acceptance, the Tibetans regarded the MacMahon line "invalid".

The British did not implement the McMahon Line for over two decades, during which Tawang continued to be administered by Tibet. When the British botanist Frank Kingdon-Ward crossed the Sela Pass and entered Tawang in 1935 without permission from Tibet, he was briefly arrested. 
The Tibetan government lodged a formal complaint against Britain. This drew the attention of the British, who re-examined the Indo-Tibetan border, and attempted to revive the McMahon Line. In November, the British government demanded that Tibet implement the border agreement. This met with resistance from the Tibetan government which implied that China's acceptance of the Simla Convention was a prerequisite to all such concerns. Tibet refused to surrender Tawang, partly because of the importance attached to the Tawang Monastery. In 1938 the British made a move to assert sovereignty over Tawang by sending a small military column under Capt. G.S. Lightfoot to Tawang. The invasion was met with strong resistance from the Tibetan government, a serious protest was lodged against the British Indian government.

After the outbreak of the war between China and Japan in 1941, the government of Assam undertook a number of 'forward policy' measures to tighten their hold on the North East Frontier Agency (NEFA) area, which later became Arunachal Pradesh. In 1944 administrative control was extended over the area of the Tawang tract lying south of the Sela Pass when J.P. Mills set up an Assam Rifles post at Dirang Dzong and sent the Tibetan tax-collectors packing. Tibetan protests were brushed aside. However, no steps were taken to evict Tibet from the area north of the pass which contained Tawang town.

The situation continued after India's independence but underwent a decisive change in 1950 when Tibet lost its autonomy and was incorporated into the newly established People's Republic of China. In February 1951, India sent an official with a small escort and several hundred porters to Tawang and took control of the remainder of the Tawang tract from the Tibetans, removing the Tibetan administration. The Indian efforts were warmly welcomed by the native population as a respite from an oppressive feudal regime. During the Sino-Indian war of 1962, Tawang fell briefly under Chinese control, but China voluntarily withdrew its troops at the end of the war, and Tawang returned to Indian administration. But China has not relinquished its claims on most of Arunachal Pradesh including Tawang.

Geography

Climate
The climate is warm and temperate in Tawang. In winter, there is much less rainfall in Tawang than in summer. According to Köppen and Geiger, this climate is classified as Cwb.

Demographics
As of the 2011 census, Tawang had a population of 11,202.

Tawang Monastery

Tawang Monastery was founded by the Mera Lama Lodre Gyatso in accordance to the wishes of the 5th Dalai Lama, Nagwang Lobsang Gyatso. It belongs to the Gelugpa sect and is the largest Buddhist monastery in India. The name Tawang means "horse chosen". It is said to be the biggest Buddhist monastery in the world outside of Lhasa, Tibet. It is a major holy site for Tibetan Buddhists as it was the birthplace of the sixth Dalai Lama.

When the 14th Dalai Lama fled from Tibet to escape from the Chinese army, he crossed into India on 30 March 1959 and spent some days at the Tawang Monastery before reaching Tezpur in Assam on 18 April. In 2007, the Dalai Lama acknowledged that both the Tibetan government and Britain recognized the McMahon Line in 1914. He visited Tawang on 8 November 2009.  About 30,000 people, including those from neighbouring Nepal and Bhutan, attended his religious discourse.

Transportation

Airport
Tawang Air Force Station has an already functional heliport .The Indian Airforce (IAF) has offered the upgraded ALG in Tawang for the operation of civil helicopter and flights for the tourism and UDAN scheme.

The nearest functional civil airports with scheduled flights are the Lokpriya Gopinath Bordoloi International Airport at Guwahati and Salonibari Airport at Tezpur located at a distance of 450 and 325 kilometers, respectively.

Railway

The nearest existing railway station is at Naharlagun, which is connected to major cities. A broad-gauge railway line connecting Missamari in Assam with Tawang has been proposed and a survey for the line was sanctioned in 2011.

The proposed 166 km long Bhalukpong–Tawang railway link from the existing Bhalukpong railway station to Tawang in Arunachal Pradesh being undertaken as the national project will boost tourism and enhance the national security with faster movement of troops, it will pass through elevations of over 10,000 feet, 80% of the tracks will be through tunnels and the longest tunnel will be 29.48 km long. This link will reduce the existing 285 km Bhalukpong-Tawang road distance by 119 km, and shorten the road distance. As well as the railway, a 2 lane road highway will also be developed along the rail line. Once completed, further extension plans include a 100 km long western spur to Yongphulla Airport (upgraded by India and jointly used by the Indian Army and Bhutan Army) in eastern Bhutan via Yabab in India and Trashigang in Bhutan.

Road

Border Roads Organisation (BRO) was tasked in July 2020 to build the strategic road from Lumla west of Tawang in India Trashigang in Bhutan through Sakteng Wildlife Sanctuary which will reduce Guwahati to Tawang by 150 km and enable rapid deployment of troops in eastern Bhutan and in Tawang sector of India–China–Bhutan boder. This will be an upgrade of the existing Malo Road along Manas River (Dangme Chu River in Bhutanse) to National Highway standards, of this 40 km new winding road the 11 km Khitshang Road–Manlo Road stretch from Duksum on Trashiyangtse–Tashigang Road to Bhutan-India border in the east as well Lumla in India to Bhutan-India border already exists, only 10 km of new road needs to be constructed and the rest will be an upgrade of the existing roads. There are proposals to build more roads to connect eastern Bhutan with western Tawang such as Trashigang–Namshu Road, the Chorten Kora–Zemithang Road, road upgrade in Bhutan to Singye Dzong on Bhutan-China border, and an advance landing ground airstrip near Singye Dzong area along with more helipads in this area.

Sela Tunnel through Sela Pass is an under-construction road tunnel project to ensure all-weather connectivity between Guwahati in Assam and Tawang in Arunachal Pradesh state of India. The tunnel gets its name from 4170 m (13,700 ft) Sela Pass which this tunnel will cut across and reduce the distance between Dirang and Tawang by 10 km. The Government of India announced the funding for construction of all weather transport tunnel in 2018-19 budget. Construction started in Jan/Feb 2019 and ends by December 2022. The tunnel which is being constructed by the Border Roads Organisation (BRO) will cut the travel time from the Indian Army's IV Corps headquarter at Tezpur to Tawang by at least 10 km or 1 hour, and it will also help make the NH13 an all-weather road to access Tawang which usually gets disconnected during winter. Pass itself is located at 13,700 feet, but the tunnel will pass through at the height of 10,000 feet. BRO is also improving the road from Sangestar Tso (north of Tawang) to Bum La Pass on India–China Line of Actual Control (disputed parts of McMahon Line). The tenders for construction were floated in 2018, and Prime Minister Narendra Modi laid the foundation stone in Feb 2019 to commence the construction.

Tourism

Tawang receives snowfall every year during December–January. There is also a ski lift in town. Visitors to Tawang, as is the case with the entire Arunachal Pradesh, require special Inner Line Permit (ILP) issued by the concerned government body and can be obtained from offices based in Kolkata, Guwahati, Tezpur, and New Delhi. Tourists can travel to Tawang from Tezpur, Assam by road and Tezpur has direct flights from Kolkata. In Oct 2014, a biweekly helicopter service from Guwahati was started by the Arunachal Pradesh government.

Other notable and worth visiting places include: Sela Pass, Bumla, Lumla, Shonga-tser (Madhuri) Lake, PTSO Lake, Zemithang.

See also
 China–India relations
 Tourism in North East India

Notes

References

Bibliography
 Gyume Dorje. (1999). Footprint Tibet Handbook with Bhutan. Footprint Handbooks, Bath, England. .

External links 

 
 

 
Hill stations in Arunachal Pradesh
Tourism in Northeast India